Gary Blackledge (born 4 April 1958) was a Northern Ireland footballer who, playing as a forward, scored 159 goals in just over 200 games for Glentoran.

He was Ronnie McFall's first signing in 1979 when he was transferred to Glentoran from Portadown for £9,000. During his career Blackledge was named by the Northern Ireland Football Writers' Association as Player of the Month five times, which was the joint record until 2006.

References

External links
 

1958 births
Living people
People from Belfast
Association footballers from Northern Ireland
Association football forwards
Northern Ireland Football Writers' Association Players of the Year
NIFL Premiership players
Portadown F.C. players
Glentoran F.C. players
Chaumont FC players
Glenavon F.C. players
Crusaders F.C. players
Carrick Rangers F.C. players
Expatriate association footballers from Northern Ireland
Expatriate footballers in France